Walter Dexel (born 7 February 1890 in Munich, died 8 June 1973 in Braunschweig) was a German painter, commercial graphic designer, and transportation planner. He also functioned as an art historian and directed a museum in Braunschweig during the Second World War.

References

External links

1890 births
1973 deaths
German graphic designers